Grljan is a suburb of the city of Zaječar, Serbia, near the Bulgarian border. According to the 2002 census, the town had a population of 2,839. Grljan is mentioned for the first time in Turkish documents from 1530. In 1784, Austrian spy Franz Pokorny in his report mention this village as a Christian settlement with 120 homes and Turkish roadhouse with capacity for 40 horses.

The town's elementary school was founded in 1842, which makes it one of the oldest schools in district. In the Serbian-Ottoman War (1876-78), Grljan was buried to the ground. Its church was built in 1899. Great influence for economic development of this local community had mines near Vrska Cuka. In beginning of 20th century Grljan had a briquette factory. After World War Two, Grljan was headquarter of companies TIMBAS (Timok coal mines) and Investgradnja. Since that period in the village, there is now only a small industrial zone. From 1978. there has been a unique festival of authentic music of Serbia, which gather the best artists on traditional wind instruments.

Todor Kostadinov, fighter from the First Serbian Uprising, and Radul-Bey Gligorijević, landowner and founder of Radul-begov Konak in Zaječar, are notable people from the town.

References

Populated places in Zaječar District